Cloudberry Kingdom is a platform game created by Pwnee Studios. The game uses a set of algorithms developed by Jordan Fisher to create procedurally generated levels that can be adaptive to player skill level, in game character abilities, and alteration of game physics.

Cloudberry Kingdom is a downloadable title for Microsoft Windows, PlayStation 3, Wii U and Xbox 360.

Reception 

The PlayStation 3 and Wii U versions received "generally favorable reviews", while the Xbox 360 and PC versions received "average" reviews, according to the review aggregation website Metacritic.

Delisting 
In May 2020, the game's publisher, Ubisoft, delisted Cloudberry Kingdom on Steam with no announcement. Pwnee Studios did not comment.

References

External links 
 

2013 video games
Cancelled Linux games
Cancelled macOS games
Cancelled PlayStation Vita games
Indie video games
Kickstarter-funded video games
Multiplayer and single-player video games
PlayStation 3 games
PlayStation Network games
PlayStation Vita games
Ubisoft games
Video games developed in the United States
Video games using procedural generation
Wii U eShop games
Windows games
Xbox 360 Live Arcade games